Kent Dennis Bottenfield (born November 14, 1968) is an American former professional baseball pitcher, who played in Major League Baseball (MLB) for the Montreal Expos, Colorado Rockies, San Francisco Giants, Chicago Cubs, St. Louis Cardinals, Anaheim Angels, Philadelphia Phillies, and Houston Astros, from 1992 to 2001.

Career
Bottenfield was drafted by the Montreal Expos in the fourth round (96th overall) of the 1986 MLB Draft.

Bottenfield's best season came in 1999 with the Cardinals, when he posted an 18–7 won-loss record along with a 3.97 ERA. Bottenfield played in the All-Star game that year. He was traded along with Adam Kennedy to the Angels for Jim Edmonds following this season. He finished the 2000 season with a 5.40 ERA and did not appear in the major leagues after 2001.

After baseball
After overcoming a near-fatal heart condition, Bottenfield turned his attention to music. He has released two independent Christian albums "Take Me Back" (2004) and the newest release "Back In The Game" (2007). He currently resides in Florida with his family, and he is the head coach of the Palm Beach Atlantic University baseball team.  After being named associate head coach in August 2011, he was named to replace head coach Gary Carter after Carter died of cancer in February 2012.

References

External links

1968 births
Living people
American expatriate baseball players in Canada
Anaheim Angels players
Baseball players from Portland, Oregon
Burlington Expos players
Chicago Cubs players
Colorado Rockies players
Colorado Springs Sky Sox players
Houston Astros players
Indianapolis Indians players
Iowa Cubs players
Jacksonville Expos players
Major League Baseball pitchers
Montreal Expos players
National League All-Stars
Philadelphia Phillies players
Phoenix Firebirds players
Round Rock Express players
San Francisco Giants players
St. Louis Cardinals players
Toledo Mud Hens players
West Palm Beach Expos players
Leodis V. McDaniel High School alumni